San Luis Circuit may refer to:

Autódromo Rosendo Hernández, a permanent race circuit in San Luis Province, Argentina
Potrero de los Funes Circuit, a semi-permanent race circuit in San Luis Province, Argentina